Stanyslav Pylypovych Lyudkevych (24 January 1879 – 10 September 1979) was a Ukrainian composer, theorist, teacher, and musical activist. He was the People's Artist of the USSR in 1969. He earned a Doctor of Philosophy in musicology in Vienna, 1908. His name may alternatively be spelled as Stanislaw Ludkiewicz  (Polish) or Stanislav Filipovich Ludkevich (Russian).

Biography 
Lyudkevych was born in 1879 in Jaroslau, Austria-Hungary (now Jarosław, Poland). He is a former student of the Lviv Academic Gymnasium. From 1898 to 1907 Lyudkevych studied philosophy in the Lviv University. Although he initially learned music theory privately from his mother who was a pianist, Lyudkevych studied with Mieczysław Sołtys in Lviv and with O. Tsemlinsky and H. Hredener in Vienna. From 1901, Lyudkevych worked as a teacher in Lviv and Przemyśl.

From 1905 to 1907, Lyudkevych was an editor of the magazine "Artistic Bulletin". He was one of the organizers of the higher musical institute in Lviv named after Mykola Lysenko, in 1910—1915 he was its director, and from 1919, teacher of theoretical disciplines and inspector of legal entities. He worked with the choirs Boyan, Bandurist, Surma. In 1936, Lyudkevych became head of the musicological commission of the Shevchenko Scientific Society. In 1939-72, he was a professor in the institute named after Mykola Lysenko.

He died on September 10, 1979 in Lviv.

Works 
 Opera - "Dovbush" (1955)
 Monumental Cantatas including the symphony-cantatas "Caucasus" (1905–13) and "Zapovit" ("Will", 1934, 2nd edition 1955) based on words by Taras Shevchenko both for which he won the Republican Prize in the name of Taras Shevchenko in 1964
 Symphonic works - symphonic poems, sinfoniettas, chamber and other instrumental pieces
 Choral works
 Romances
 Songs.
 He systematized folk songs.

He was the author of numerous musicological works, was a publicist, and originator and editor of musical publications.

Style 
The participation of Lyudkevych in the revolutionary-democratic movement of Western Ukraine lead to the ideological orientation of his activities and works.

Honors 
 1964 — State Prize of the Ukrainian SSR in the name of Taras Shevchenko for his Symphony-Canata "Caucasus" and his vocal-symphonic cantata "Zapovit" based on words by Taras Shevchenko.
 1969 — People's Artist of USSR.
 1979 — Hero of Socialist Work.
 Featured on a Ukrainian stamp.
 Lviv Art College is named after S. Ludkevych as well as streets in Lviv, Stryi, Pustomyty and also Jarosław (Poland), where Lyudkevych was born.

See also
List of Ukrainian composers - see other Ukrainian composers of the same period

References

External links 
 Lyudkevich Stanislav (1879-1979) - Piano music by Russian composers of 20th century, MIDI archive
 Information about Lyudkevych on Ukrainian Art Song Project's website
 Info about Stanyslav Lyudkevych 

1879 births
1979 deaths
Ukrainian centenarians
Men centenarians
People's Artists of the USSR
People from Jarosław
People from the Kingdom of Galicia and Lodomeria
Ukrainian Austro-Hungarians
Ukrainian classical composers
Members of the Shevchenko Scientific Society
Ukrainian music educators
Recipients of the Shevchenko National Prize
Burials at Lychakiv Cemetery